The following is a list of magazines published in Chile.

Political magazines
 Ercilla - Biweekly magazine
 Punto Final - fortnightly magazine
 Qué Pasa - weekly magazine, owned by COPESA

Entertainment magazines
 Glamorama - included in the Friday edition of La Tercera
 TV y Novelas - owned by Televisa
 Wikén - included in the Friday edition of El Mercurio

Women's magazines
 Cosmopolitan - owned by Televisa

Outdoor magazines
 Patagon Journal - bilingual magazine about Patagonia
 Escalando - climbing magazine
 Outdoors - adventure sports magazine

Humor magazines
 Condorito - owned by Televisa

See also
List of Chilean newspapers
 Television in Chile

References

Chile
Mass media in Chile
Magazines